Daniel Zhen Sheng Wong (born 17 November 1997) is an Australian soccer player who plays as a forward for Shijiazhuang Gongfu.

Career
In 2016, Wong signed for the reserve side of Spanish La Liga team Espanyol from the youth academy of Chesterfield in England.

For the second half of 2018–19, he signed for Spanish fourth division team Jove Español, having left fellow Spanish side C.F.I. Alicante.

For the 2020 season, he signed for Beijing Renhe in the Chinese second division.

References

External links
 

Living people
1997 births
People educated at Endeavour Sports High School
Australian soccer players
Association football forwards
Chesterfield F.C. players
RCD Espanyol B footballers
Beijing Renhe F.C. players
Inner Mongolia Zhongyou F.C. players
Australian people of Chinese descent